Châtillon-sur-Saône (literally Châtillon on Saône) is a commune in the Vosges department in Grand Est in northeastern France.

See also
Communes of the Vosges department

References

External links
Town website

Communes of Vosges (department)